Round Lake is located southeast of Kalurah, New York. Fish species present in the lake are brook trout, and black bullhead. Access via old railroad bed from the west and a trail from Aldric from the east.

References

Lakes of St. Lawrence County, New York
Lakes of New York (state)